WASP-32 (also known as TYC 2-1155-1) is a yellow main-sequence star in the constellation of Pisces. The star was given the formal name Parumleo in January 2020, Latin for small lion and referencing the national animal of Singapore.

Star characteristics 
The WASP-32 star is relatively depleted of lithium, which is common for massive stars hosting hot Jupiter planets.

Planetary system 
The "hot Jupiter" class planet WASP-32 b, later named Viculus, was discovered around WASP-32 in 2010.
It was found to orbit the parent star in prograde direction in 2014.

The follow-up study utilizing transit timing variation analysis, have failed to find any, therefore have excluded existence of other massive planets around WASP-32 as in 2015.

References 

Planetary systems with one confirmed planet
Pisces (constellation)
G-type main-sequence stars
Planetary transit variables
Parumleo
J00155080+0112016
32